Eric Sehn (born 16 November 1984) is a Canadian diver. He competed for Canada at the 2012 Summer Olympics.

References

1984 births
Living people
Divers from Edmonton
Divers at the 2012 Summer Olympics
Olympic divers of Canada
Canadian male divers
Divers at the 2010 Commonwealth Games
Divers at the 2011 Pan American Games
Commonwealth Games bronze medallists for Canada
Pan American Games bronze medalists for Canada
Commonwealth Games medallists in diving
Pan American Games medalists in diving
Medalists at the 2011 Pan American Games
Medallists at the 2010 Commonwealth Games